Joan Kipkemoi Rotich (born 27 November 1993) is a Kenyan long-distance runner who specialises in the 3000 metres steeplechase.

Born in Kericho, Kenya, she first emerged at national level in 2014. At the Kenyan Athletics Championships she ran a personal best time of 9:44.00 minutes for the steeplechase to finish second behind Purity Kirui.

This gained her selection for the Kenyan team at the 2014 Commonwealth Games. At the competition she ran a personal best of 9:33.34 minutes to place third in the 3000 m steeplechase final. Her performance made it a Kenyan medal sweep, as her compatriots Kirui and Milcah Chemos Cheywa took the top two spots.

References

External links

Living people
1993 births
Kenyan female steeplechase runners
Kenyan female long-distance runners
Commonwealth Games bronze medallists for Kenya
Athletes (track and field) at the 2014 Commonwealth Games
People from Kericho County
Commonwealth Games medallists in athletics
21st-century Kenyan women
Medallists at the 2014 Commonwealth Games